André Waignein (28 January 1942 – 22 November 2015) was a Belgian composer, conductor, trumpeter, and musicologist. He is well known for his symphonies with over six hundred compositions at the time of his death. Waignein's symphonies were known to be lively and upbeat, and they reflected his character. He was a professor at the Conservatoire Royal de Bruxelles and a director at the 

He wrote under the pseudonyms of Rita Defoort (the name of his wife), Rob Ares, Luc Gistel, Roland Kernen, and Larry Foster.

References

People from Mouscron
1942 births
2015 deaths
Belgian composers
Concert band composers
Male composers
Belgian male musicians
Academic staff of the Royal Conservatory of Brussels
Belgian trumpeters